The Minister of Police (formerly known as the Minister for Safety and Security) is a minister in the Government of South Africa with political responsibility for the Department of Police, including the South African Police Service, the Independent Police Investigative Directorate, the Private Security industry Regulatory Authority, and the Civilian Secretariat for Police. The current Minister of police is General Bheki Cele.

References

External links
 South African Police Service
 Independent Police Investigative Directorate
 Civilian Secretariat for Police
 Private Security Industry Regulatory Authority

Police
Law enforcement in South Africa